Pope Nicholas could refer to:
Pope Nicholas I
Pope Nicholas II
Pope Nicholas III
Pope Nicholas IV
Pope Nicholas V
 Antipope Nicholas V

See also
Nicholas Pope

Nicholas